Punta Galera Airport ,  is an airstrip located  west-northwest of La Unión, a city in the Los Ríos Region of Chile.

The airstrip is on an isolated point on the Pacific coast. Limited overruns on either end are grass with a downslope to a dropoff into the ocean. Approach and departures are over the water..

See also

Transport in Chile
List of airports in Chile

References

External links
OpenStreetMap - Punta Galera
OurAirports - Punta Galera
FallingRain - Punta Galera Airport

Airports in Chile
Airports in Los Ríos Region
Coasts of Los Ríos Region